Rawle Junior Kalomo Marshall  (born February 20, 1982) is a Guyanese-American professional basketball player who last played for Shahrdari Gorgan of the Iranian Super League.

Early life
Marshall is a 2000 graduate of Detroit's Mackenzie High School, where he was salutatorian of his senior class.

Marshall's favorite basketball player as a youth was Penny Hardaway.

College career
Marshall spent his college freshman season at Ball State University, but then moved to Oakland University for his final three collegiate seasons. He was named Mid-Continent Conference's Newcomer of the Year and Defensive Player of the Year during his sophomore season in 2002–03. During his senior season in 2004–05, he helped Oakland win its first Mid-Continent Conference title. Marshall was named Most Valuable Player of the tournament. His stats during his three years with Oakland were 18.6 points per game, 6.3 rebounds per game, 2.2 steals per game and 1.1 blocks per game. He also became Oakland University's all-time leader in blocked shots in 90 games played.

Professional career

NBA

Not selected during the 2005 NBA Draft, Marshall has participated in several NBA Summer Leagues (Southern California Summer Pro League with the Memphis Grizzlies, Rocky Mountain Revue with the Dallas Mavericks). His performances (18.6 points per game, 3.0 rebounds per game and 1.4 assists per game in 27.4 minutes per game in the Rocky Mountain Revue) helped him to earn a one-year contract with the Dallas Mavericks on August 5, 2005.

Marshall did not find the court much early in his rookie season with the Mavericks. Instead, Marshall was sent to the NBA D-League team the Fort Worth Flyers, where he averaged 17.4 points per game. He then returned to the Dallas Mavericks, where he started multiple games due to injuries to Josh Howard, Adrian Griffin, and Devin Harris. While his minutes still were limited, he surpassed the expectations that surrounded an average undrafted rookie. However, he did not make the Mavericks' playoffs roster in 2006. On July 23, 2006, Marshall was traded to the Indiana Pacers, along with Darrell Armstrong and Josh Powell, for Anthony Johnson. He spent the 2006–07 season with the Pacers.

Europe and Asia

Marshall played with the Serbian club KK Hemofarm during the 2007–08 season. He also played with Hemofarm in that season's EuroCup (the 2nd tier European-wide competition) and the regional Adriatic League. He averaged 17.3 points per game in the EuroCup and 15.7 points per game in the Adriatic League. With his team Hemofarm he reached last 16 in EuroCup, where they lost to later finalist Akasvayu Girona. He was also finalist in Adriatic league and Basketball League of Serbia, where in both cases Hemofarm was defeated by KK Partizan.

He then moved to the Croatian League club KK Cibona for the 2008–09 season, a club also of the regional Adriatic League and also of the top European-wide competition the EuroLeague. He was honored as the EuroLeague Round 7 MVP during the 2008–09 season. He joined the LNB Pro A club ASVEL in 2009. In August 2010 he joined PAOK.

In July 2011, he signed with BC Astana in Kazakhstan. In October 2013, he signed with CSU Asesoft Ploiești.

On December 7, 2014, Marshall signed with Koroivos Amaliadas of Greece.

See also
 List of foreign basketball players in Serbia

References

External links
ACB League Profile  
FIBA.com Profile
Euroleague.net Profile
Eurobasket.net Profile

1982 births
Living people
ABA League players
American expatriate basketball people in Croatia
American expatriate basketball people in France
American expatriate basketball people in Greece
American expatriate basketball people in Iran
American expatriate basketball people in Lebanon
American expatriate basketball people in Romania
American expatriate basketball people in Russia
American expatriate basketball people in Serbia
American expatriate basketball people in Spain
American expatriate basketball people in the Dominican Republic
American expatriate basketball people in Kazakhstan
American men's basketball players
ASVEL Basket players
Ball State Cardinals men's basketball players
Basketball players from Detroit
Basketball League of Serbia players
BC Astana players
CSU Asesoft Ploiești players
Dallas Mavericks players
Fort Worth Flyers players
Guyanese emigrants to the United States
Guyanese expatriate basketball people in Serbia
Guyanese men's basketball players
Huracanes del Atlántico players
Indiana Pacers players
KK Cibona players
KK Hemofarm players
Koroivos B.C. players
Liga ACB players
Maratonistas de Coamo players
Oakland Golden Grizzlies men's basketball players
P.A.O.K. BC players
PBC Lokomotiv-Kuban players
Small forwards
Mackenzie High School (Michigan) alumni
Undrafted National Basketball Association players
Valencia Basket players